The Royal Australian Navy has deployed ships to the Middle East over 57 times since 1990. These ships have participated in the 1991 Gulf War, enforced sanctions against Iraq, taken part in the 2003 Invasion of Iraq and provided security for Iraq's oil exports. Since 2009 Australian ships have also been involved in counter piracy operations.

The dates provided are the dates the ship arrived and departed from the Middle East Area of Operations.  Please see the Database of Royal Australian Navy Operations 1990–2005 for the dates the ships arrived and departed from Australia. Except where otherwise noted, all ships mainly operated in the Persian Gulf.

Deployments

Notes

References 
 Vanessa Bendle (Principal author), David Griffin, Peter Laurence, Richard McMillan, Brett Mitchell, Greg Nash, John Perryman, David Stevens, Nial Wheate Database of Royal Australian Navy Operations 1990–2005. Seapower Centre – Australia.
 Greg Nash and David Stevens (2006) Australia's Navy in the Gulf. From Countenance to Catalyst, 1941–2006. Topmill, Sydney.

Middle East warships
Warship deployments to the Middle East